Constance J. Chang-Hasnain is chairperson and founder of Berxel Photonics Co. Ltd. and Whinnery Professor Emerita of the University of California, Berkeley. She was President of Optica in 2021.

She obtained a B.S. degree in electrical and computer engineering from University of California, Davis in 1982, an M.S. and a Ph.D. in electrical engineering and computer science from the University of California, Berkeley in 1984 and 1987, respectively. She was a member of technical staff at Bellcore from 1987 to 1992 and assistant professor at Stanford University between 1992 and 1995. She joined the University of California Berkeley as professor of electrical engineering and computer sciences in 1996. She was Whinnery Distinguished Chair Professor 2006-2020; chair of the Nanoscale Science and Engineering Graduate Group 2006-2017; and associate dean for strategic alliances of College of Engineering 2014-2019.  She was the founding co-director of Tsinghua-Berkeley Shenzhen Institute (TBSI) 2015-2020 and the chief academic officer of Berkeley Education Alliance for Research in Singapore (BEARS) 2015-2018.  

She is a Fellow of the IEEE, The Optical Society, and the Institution of Engineering and Technology.  She was editor-in-chief for the IEEE Journal of Lightwave Technologies.

Her research interests include VCSELs, high contrast gratings, and nanostructure growth.

Chang-Hasnain was elected a member of the National Academy of Engineering in 2018 for contributions to wavelength tunable diode lasers and multiwavelength laser arrays.

Awards
IEEE LEOS Distinguished Lecturer Award, 1994
Curtis W. McGraw Research Award from the American Society of Engineering Education, 2000
IEEE William Streifer Scientific Achievement Award, 2003
National Academy of Engineering, Gilbreth Lecturer Award, 2005
Nick Holonyak Jr. Award, Optical Society of America, 2007 
For contributions to the control of diode lasers: vertical cavity surface emitting laser arrays, injection locking and slow light
Guggenheim Fellow, 2009 
Humboldt Research Award, Alexander von Humboldt Stiftung Foundation, 2009 
Vannevar Bush Faculty Fellowship (formerly National Security Science and Engineering Faculty Fellowship), 2008
IEEE David Sarnoff Award, 2011
UNESCO Medal For the Development of Nanoscience and Nanotechnologies, 2015 
Elected Member, National Academy of Engineering, 2018 
The Okawa Prize, 2018
For pioneering and outstanding research of VCSEL photonics through the development of their novel functions for optical communications and optical sensing.
The Welker Award, 2022
For pioneering contributions to VCSEL photonics, nano-photonics and high contrast metastructures for optical communications and optical sensing

References

External links
Constance J. Chang-Hasnain at University of California, Berkeley

American electrical engineers
University of California, Davis alumni
UC Berkeley College of Engineering alumni
Living people
Stanford University School of Engineering faculty
1960 births
UC Berkeley College of Engineering faculty
Fellows of Optica (society)
Fellow Members of the IEEE
Academic journal editors
American university and college faculty deans
Humboldt Research Award recipients
Fellows of the Institution of Electrical Engineers
American women engineers
20th-century American engineers
21st-century American engineers
20th-century Taiwanese scientists
21st-century Taiwanese scientists
Taiwanese women engineers
Taiwanese electrical engineers
Taiwanese emigrants to the United States
Women in optics
Optical engineers
21st-century American women